Man of the People is a 1937 American drama film directed by Edwin L. Marin and written by Frank Dolan. The film stars Joseph Calleia, Florence Rice, Thomas Mitchell, Ted Healy and Catherine Doucet. The film was released on January 29, 1937, by Metro-Goldwyn-Mayer.

Plot
All that attorney Jack Moreno wants to do is help his friends and the people from his neighbourhood, but in order to make a living he has to do business with the mob.

Cast 
Joseph Calleia as Jack Moreno
Florence Rice as Abbey
Thomas Mitchell as Grady
Ted Healy as Joe 'The Glut'
Catherine Doucet as Mrs. Reid
Paul Stanton as Stringer
Jonathan Hale as Carter Spetner
Robert Emmett Keane as Murphy
Jane Barnes as Marie Rossetti
William Ricciardi as 'Pop' Rossetti
Noel Madison as 'Dopey' Benny
Soledad Jiménez as Mrs. Rossetti 
Edward Nugent as Edward Spetner
Donald Briggs as Baldwin

Gallery

References

External links 

 

1937 films
1930s English-language films
American drama films
1937 drama films
Metro-Goldwyn-Mayer films
Films directed by Edwin L. Marin
American black-and-white films
Films scored by Edward Ward (composer)
1930s American films